The 1931 Mississippi A&M Aggies football team was an American football team that represented the Agricultural and Mechanical College of the State of Mississippi (now known as Mississippi State University) as a member of the Southern Conference during the 1931 college football season. In their first season under head coach Ray G. Dauber, Mississippi A&M compiled a 2–6 record.

Schedule

References

Mississippi AandM
Mississippi State Bulldogs football seasons
Mississippi AandM Aggies football